Kleine Aa may refer to:

Chli Aa (Schwyz), a river in canton of Schwyz, Switzerland
Chli Aa (Sempachersee), a tributary of Lake Sempach in the canton of Lucerne, Switzerland
Kleine Aa (Aabach), a tributary of the Aabach in North Rhine-Westphalia, Germany
Kleine Aa (Someren), headwater stream of the Aa (Meuse) in the province of North Brabant, Netherlands

See also
 AA (disambiguation)